Marcus C. Peacock (born March 21, 1960) was the minority staff director at the U.S. Senate Committee on the Budget. He is a former Deputy Administrator of the United States Environmental Protection Agency (EPA).  He served at the EPA from August 8, 2005 to January 20, 2009. Marcus Peacock currently works as the Chief Operating Officer at Business Roundtable.

Education
Peacock received a Bachelor of Science degree in Industrial and Systems Engineering from the University of Southern California and a Master of Public Policy from Harvard University's John F. Kennedy School of Government. He is a Fellow of the National Academy of Public Administration and a senior member of the Institute of Industrial Engineers.

Bush Administration Career Prior to EPA

Before working at EPA, Mr. Peacock was an Associate Director at the U.S. Office of Management and Budget (OMB).

While at OMB, Mr. Peacock created the Performance Assessment Rating Tool, or PART, which was used to rate the effectiveness of federal programs.  The PART won Harvard University's Innovations in Government Award in 2005 and the American Society for Public Administration's Leadership Award in 2007. During this time, Mr. Peacock also helped develop a performance-based system for funding U.S. Army Corps of Engineers' projects and for this work, in 2006, was awarded the Army's Outstanding Civilian Service Medal.

EPA Deputy Administrator

During his tenure Peacock overhauled EPA's performance management system.  This included publishing a quarterly performance report to the public called the EPAStat Quarterly Report, the first 'Stat' program in the federal government. EPAStat copied performance management systems used by local governments, such as "CitiStat" in the City of Baltimore. These improvements led to EPA winning the President's Quality Award for Overall Management, "the highest award given to federal agencies for management excellence," in 2007 and 2008.  It is the first time a federal agency has won the award back-to-back. Peacock was an early adopter of Web 2.0 technology in government and was the first federal political appointee to maintain a public blog.

The Pew Charitable Trusts
Under a two-year contract with the Pew Charitable Trusts from 2009 to 2010, Mr. Peacock directed Subsidyscope, an initiative to collect data on subsidies provided by the U.S. government and make this information available to the public.

Jeb Bush 2016 Campaign 
During Governor Bush's presidential campaign, Peacock served as Bush's Deputy Director for Policy and assisted in directing a group of policy experts. Peacock's work included production of policy ideas and documents for the candidate, management of external working groups, and coordination with Political and Communications departments.

Minority Staff Director 
Peacock served as the Minority Staff Director for the United States Senate, Committee on the Budget from January 2011 to June 2013. His duties included directing staff during Committee markup and floor consideration of the fiscal year 2014 Budget Resolution including the processing of 573 floor amendments—more than double the previous high—and 106 separate votes. Further, over several months in 2012, Peacock assisted minority Senators in successfully defending seven consecutive attempts by the majority to waive Budget Act points of order on the Senate floor – the longest such streak since 1974.

Distinguished Research Professor 

From March 2013 to June 2016 Peacock served as a visiting scholar for The George Washington University Regulatory Studies Center. In July 2016 he received the designation of Distinguished Research Professor. As part of his role at the Regulatory Studies Center he writes articles and public comments on regulatory policy and relevant political events.

Business Roundtable 
Marcus Peacock is the current Chief Operating Officer at Business Roundtable. Donald Trump waived Peacock's five-year lobbying ban on administration officials before Peacock joined Business Roundtable.

Controversies

Blog
In early 2008, Mr. Peacock was criticized for using his government sponsored blog for a post concerning the singer Amy Winehouse"

EPA Libraries
Starting in 2006 Peacock defended plans to close some of EPA's libraries in favor of digitizing the documents.  The plans were ultimately reversed by a Congressional earmark in 2007.

References

Marcus Peacock profile

External links
U.S. Senate Budget Committee
Subsidyscope
Environmental Protection Agency
President's Quality Award
Marcus Peacock Federal Times Op-Ed
Marcus Peacock Federal Times Article
Army Civilian Service Medal
Baltimore CitiStat

Administrators of the United States Environmental Protection Agency
1960 births
Living people
USC Viterbi School of Engineering alumni
Harvard Kennedy School alumni